In topology, constructible sets are a class of subsets of a topological space that have a relatively "simple" structure.
They are used particularly in algebraic geometry and related fields. A key result known as Chevalley's theorem
in algebraic geometry shows that the image of a constructible set is constructible for an important class of mappings
(more specifically morphisms) of algebraic varieties (or more generally schemes).
In addition, a large number of "local" geometric properties of schemes, morphisms and sheaves are (locally) constructible.
Constructible sets also feature in the definition of various types of constructible sheaves in algebraic geometry
and intersection cohomology.

Definitions

A simple definition, adequate in many situations, is that a constructible set is a finite union of locally closed sets. (A set is locally closed if it is the intersection of an open set and closed set.) 
However, a modification and another slightly weaker definition are needed to have definitions that behave better with "large" spaces:

Definitions: A subset  of a topological space  is called retrocompact if  is compact for every compact open subset .

Equivalently the constructible subsets of a topological space  are the smallest collection  of subsets of  that (i) contains all open retrocompact subsets and (ii) contains all complements and finite unions (and hence also finite intersections) of sets in it. In other words, constructible sets are precisely the Boolean algebra generated by retrocompact open subsets.

In a locally noetherian topological space, all subsets are retrocompact, and so for such spaces the simplified definition given first above is equivalent to the more elaborate one. Most of the commonly met schemes in algebraic geometry (including all algebraic varieties) are locally Noetherian, but there are important constructions that lead to more general schemes.

In any (not necessarily noetherian) topological space, every constructible set contains a dense open subset of its closure.

Terminology: The definition given here is the one used by the first edition of EGA and the Stacks Project. In the second edition of EGA constructible sets (according to the definition above) are called "globally constructible" while the word "constructible" is reserved for what are called locally constructible above.

Chevalley's theorem
A major reason for the importance of constructible sets in algebraic geometry is that the image of a (locally) constructible set is also (locally) constructible for a large class of maps (or "morphisms"). The key result is:

Chevalley's theorem.

In particular, the image of an algebraic variety need not be a variety, but is (under the assumptions) always a constructible set. For example, the map  that sends  to  has image the set , which is not a variety, but is constructible.

Chevalley's theorem in the generality stated above would fail if the simplified definition of constructible sets (without restricting to retrocompact open sets in the definition) were used.

Constructible properties
A large number of "local" properties of morphisms of schemes and quasicoherent sheaves on schemes hold true over a locally constructible subset. EGA IV § 9 covers a large number of such properties. Below are some examples (where all references point to EGA IV):
(Proposition (9.4.4))
(Proposition (9.4.7))
(Corollary (9.5.4))
 Let  be a scheme and  a morphism of -schemes. Then  is locally constructible if  is any of the following properties: surjective, proper, finite, immersion, closed immersion, open immersion, isomorphism. (Proposition (9.6.1))
Then  is locally constructible if  is any of the following properties: geometrically irreducible, geometrically connected, geometrically reduced. (Theorem (9.7.7))
Then  is locally constructible if  is any of the following properties: geometrically regular, geometrically normal, geometrically reduced. (Proposition (9.9.4))

One important role that these constructibility results have is that in most cases assuming the morphisms in questions are also 
flat it follows that the properties in question in fact hold in an open subset. A substantial number of such results is included in EGA IV § 12.

See also 
Constructible topology
Constructible sheaf

Notes

References 
 Allouche, Jean Paul. Note on the constructible sets of a topological space.
 
 Borel, Armand. Linear algebraic groups.

External links
 https://stacks.math.columbia.edu/tag/04ZC Topological definition of (local) constructibility
 https://stacks.math.columbia.edu/tag/054H Constructibility properties of morphisms of schemes (incl. Chevalley's theorem)

Topology
Algebraic geometry